O Astro (English: The Illusionist) is a Brazilian telenovela produced and broadcast by Globo. It was broadcast from July 12, 2011 to October 28, 2011, and consisted of 64 episodes. In 2011 the plot was winner of the International Emmy Award in the category Best Telenovela. The series follows an illusionist who wins fortune and love through his magic tricks, while he is also persecuted by the enemies he makes.

It stars Rodrigo Lombardi, Carolina Ferraz, Regina Duarte, Marco Ricca, Thiago Fragoso, Alinne Moraes, Humberto Martins, and Henri Castelli.

Cast 
 Rodrigo Lombardi as Herculano Quintanilha (Professor Astro)
 Carolina Ferraz as Amanda Mello Assunção Quintanilha
 Thiago Fragoso as  Márcio Hayalla
 Alinne Moraes as Lili (Lilian Paranhos Hayalla) 
 Fernanda Rodrigues as Josephine "Jôse" Mello Assunção
 Daniel Filho as Salomão Hayalla
 Regina Duarte as Clô (Clotilde Magalhães Sampaio Hayalla) 
 Marco Ricca as Samir Hayalla
 Humberto Martins as Neco (Ernesto Ramires de Oliveira) 
 Juliana Paes as Nina Moratti
 Henri Castelli as Felipe Cerqueira
 Guilhermina Guinle as Beatriz Schneider
 Rosamaria Murtinho as Tia Magda (Magda Sampaio Magalhães) 
 Simone Soares as Laura Paranhos de Oliveira
 Antônio Calloni as Natalino "Natal" Pimentel
 Tato Gabus Mendes as Amin Hayalla
 Vera Zimmermann as Nádia Cury Hayalla
 Carolina Kasting as Jamile Hayalla 
 Daniel Dantas as Inspetor Eustáquio Novaes 
 Reginaldo Faria as Adolfo Mello Assunção 
 Mila Moreira as Miriam Lambert Peranhos Mello Assunção
 José Rubens Chachá as Youssef Hayalla
 Bel Kutner as Sílvia
 Selma Egrei as Consolação Paranhos 
 Ellen Rocche as Valéria dos Santos
 Celso Frateschi as Nelson Cerqueira
 Sérgio Mamberti as Padre Laurindo
 Pascoal da Conceição as Inácio 
 João Baldasserini as Henri Sorei
 Frank Menezes as Cleiton 
 Bernardo Marinho as Alan Quintanilha
 Luca de Castro as Joaquim 
 Maria Pompeu as Dalva 
 Marcela Muniz as Doralice 
 Rodrigo Mendonça as Ubiraci 
 Izak Dahora as Dimas dos Santos 
 Lara Rodrigues as Lurdes "Lurdinha" Gusmão 
 Natália Souto as Das Dores (Maria das Dores Ferreira) 
 Jefferson Goulart as Aminzinho (Amin Hayalla Filho) 
 Hanna Romanazzi as Luísa Belucci 
 Luiz Magnelli as Galego 
 Tuna Dwek as Nilza 
 Carolina Chalitta as Tânia 
 Mariana Bassoul as Carmem 
 Rafael Losso as Olavo
 Úrsula Corona as Elizabeth
 Rafael Primot as Artur 
 Pablo Sanábio as Pablo Banderas 
 Jonas Mello as Dr. Alberico
 Francisco Cuoco as Ferragus

References

External links 
  
 O Astro at Memoria Globo 
 

2011 telenovelas
Brazilian telenovelas
2011 Brazilian television series debuts
2011 Brazilian television series endings
Brazilian LGBT-related television shows
TV Globo telenovelas
International Emmy Award for Best Telenovela
Portuguese-language telenovelas